"Invincible" is the name of the 2006 Eurovision Song Contest entry for , sung by Carola Häggkvist. Being one of the favourites to win, it ended up finishing 5th out of 24.

Carola performed the song in the Swedish national final in the Swedish language, under the name "Evighet" ("Eternity"). It scored 2nd place by the judges, but was a runaway winner by public votes, therefore booking Carola a place in Athens, where Eurovision was to be held.

In the singles chart, the Swedish-language version peaked at #1 in Sweden and #8 in Norway, and the English-language version peaked at #29 in Sweden.

The Swedish-language version also entered Svensktoppen on 30 April 2006 and reached 5th place, where it stayed for the two following weeks. After that it fell, being at Svensktoppen for five weeks in total. Nonetheless, the song became a huge hit in Scandinavia, and was performed at many of the Swedish top shows that year.

A cover version by Tomas Andersson Wij in 2007 was in the Swedish Trackslistan.

The BBC used an instrumental version of the song for their coverage of the 2006 European Athletics Championships, held in Gothenburg, Sweden.

Melodifestivalen and the Eurovision Song Contest

"Evighet" participated in the fourth heat of the 2006 Melodifestivalen which was held on 11 March 2006 at the Scandinavium indoor arena in Gothenburg. The song was the last of the eight competing entries to perform and directly qualified to the contest final as one of the two songs song which received the most telephone votes. On 18 March, during the final held at the Globe Arena in Stockholm, Carola were the seventh of the ten competing acts to perform, and "Evighet" won the contest with 234 points, receiving the second highest number of votes from the regional juries and the  highest number of public votes.

Due to Sweden placing 19th in the previous year's contest, Sweden were required to compete in the semi-final of the 2006 Eurovision Song Contest in Athens, Greece, the first time Sweden had not automatically qualified. In the semi-final on 18 May, with Carola performing the song in English as "Invincible", Sweden was the twentieth country to perform out of the twenty-three participants and were subsequently announced at the end of the broadcast as one of the ten countries to have qualified for the final. Carola performed again in the final on 20 May, drawn to perform as the twenty-second artist on stage, and subsequently finished in fifth place, receiving 170 points in total. The full breakdown of results published after the final revealed that in the semi-final Sweden had finished in 4th place with 214 points, including receiving the maximum 12 points from Denmark, Malta and Portugal.

Track listing and formats
International download edition
Invincible — 3:02
Invincible (SoundFactory Supreme Anthem)
Invincible (SoundFactory One Love Dub)
Invincible (SoundFactory Radio Edit)

International CD single
Invincible — 3:02
Invincible (Instrumental Version) — 2:59

Swedish CD single
Evighet — 3:01
Evighet (instrumental version) — 2:59

Charts

Invincible version

Evighet version

References

External links
"Evighet" at the Norwegian singles chart
"Evighet" at the Swedish singles chart
"Invincible" at the Swedish singles chart

Eurovision songs of Sweden
Eurovision songs of 2006
Melodifestivalen songs of 2006
Songs written by Thomas G:son
Songs written by Bobby Ljunggren
Songs written by Henrik Wikström
Carola Häggkvist songs
Songs written by Carola Häggkvist
2006 songs
2006 singles
Number-one singles in Sweden
Universal Music Group singles
Tomas Andersson Wij songs